Beaver Falls may refer to:

Places in the United States
 Beaver Falls, Minnesota
 Beaver Falls, New York
 Beaver Falls (Columbia County, Oregon)
 Beaver Falls, Pennsylvania
 Beaver Falls Township, Renville County, Minnesota
 Beaver Falls, on Havasu Creek, Arizona

Other uses
 Beaver Falls (TV series), a British comedy-drama

See also
 Beaver Creek Falls